The International Rice Festival is an annual festival held during the third weekend in October in Crowley, Louisiana, celebrating rice. The event is Louisiana's oldest agricultural festival, and one of the state's largest. The first festival was held on October 5, 1937 as the National Rice Festival; it was renamed the "International Rice Festival" in 1946 when the festival was resumed after a hiatus during World War II (1942–1945). Since the Festival's beginnings, over seven million people have attended the annual event.

There are two parades. The second is on Saturday and is the Grand Parade.  There is a rice cooking contest where contestants compete for the title of Chef de Riz, rice eating contest, farmers' banquet and the Queens' Ball.  There is also entertainment continuously from early morning to midnight and an arts and crafts exhibit, which is held adjacent to the festival grounds and also on Main Street

This festival went on hiatus in 2020 & will return in 2021. Festival Coordinator is Shanna C. Monk.

References

External links

Official website

Festivals in Louisiana
Food and drink festivals in the United States
Crowley, Louisiana
Rice production in the United States
Tourist attractions in Acadia Parish, Louisiana
Recurring events established in 1937
1937 establishments in Louisiana